Unnai Ninaithu is a 2002 Indian Tamil-language romantic drama film written and directed by Vikraman. It stars Suriya, Sneha and Laila while Ramesh Khanna, Charle, R. Sundarrajan and Ramji play supporting roles. The film opened on 10 May 2002 with high positive reviews and went on to become a commercial success. It was dubbed into Telugu as Nee Prematho and was also remade into Telugu as Cheppave Chirugali starting Venu Thottempudi.

Plot
Surya works as a receptionist in a lodge in Chennai. He, along with his friend Gopi, manages the entire lodge. Actually, the lodge is owned by Surya's father but has been leased due to financial troubles. Radha is the daughter of the new manager for the lodge who stays next to the lodge along with her mother and family. Radha gets attracted towards Surya upon seeing his good nature, but Surya tells his past love story to Radha.

A few years back, Nirmala lived in the same house where Radha lives now. Surya likes Nirmala and helps her family financially. Slowly, Surya and Nirmala fall in love, and Nirmala's parents decide to get them married. Selvam is Suriya's friend who stays with him during his initial days. Later, Selvam secures a good job and starts earning well. Selvam also gets attracted towards Nirmala and tries to impress her. Nirmala's parents consider Selvam to be a better match for Nirmala as he earns more than Surya. They convince Nirmala to marry Selvam.

Surya gets heartbroken knowing this, but one day, he finds Selvam in a shopping mall with another girl. Surya understands that Selvam has no intention of marrying Nirmala and is planning only for an illegitimate relationship with her. Surya informs this to Nirmala, who misunderstands that he is trying to break her relationship with Selvam by cooking up false stories. Nirmala, along with her family, moves to a big house given by Selvam.

The story comes to the present, and Radha is even more impressed upon listening to Surya's past love story. One day, Surya finds Nirmala and gets to know that Selvam has broken the promise to marry her and humiliated her and her family and they had to leave everything and return to poverty. Surya is worried seeing Nirmala and her family's poor state and again offers help. Nirmala had plans of pursuing MBBS before. Surya helps her in writing the entrance examination. She gets admission only in a private medical college where the fee is high. Surya sells his lodge to the lessee and gives the money to Nirmala to use it for the education fee.

Five years pass by, and Nirmala completes her medical degree and gets a job posting, as well. All these years, Surya gave her financial and moral support in pursuing her education. Meanwhile, Radha also remains unmarried as she loves Surya, but she never expressed it to him. Nirmala is about to leave to another city for a job along with her family. At the railway station, she conveys her interest in marrying Surya, who refuses her proposal by saying that he helped her only because he once loved her and didn't wish to see her in poverty, but did not harbour any feelings for her. He says that he knows that Radha is in love with him and that she has been declining all marriage alliances coming her way for the last five years waiting for Surya. Surya also says that Radha's love is more genuine than Nirmala's because Nirmala ditched him when she found a better guy than Surya, while Radha was rejecting all other proposals for him. Radha overhears the conversation and feels happy. The movie ends with both Surya and Radha getting united.

Cast

 Suriya as Suriya 
 Sneha as Radha
 Laila as Nirmala 
 Ramesh Khanna as Gopi
 Ramji as Selvam
 Balu Anand as Radha's father
 Sathyapriya as Radha's mother
 Thalaivasal Vijay as Nirmala's father
 Pallavi as Nirmala's mother
 Charle as Mei Meiyappan
 Chitra Lakshmanan as Vaidyalingam
 R. Sundarrajan as Chittoor Chinnamani
 Delhi Ganesh as Surya's Lodge owner
 Sheela  as Radha's sister
 Uma Maheshwari as Radha's sister
 Hari Prashanth as Nirmala's brother
 Kumaresan as Room Boy
 Manager Cheena as Deluxe Room Customer
 Mayilsamy as Vaidyalingam's Patient 
 Pandu as Chinnamani's friend
 Singamuthu as Mei Meiyappan's Customer
 Vanaja as Room Customer

Production
Vijay, who worked with Vikraman in Poove Unakkaga, was chosen by him to play the lead role in Unnai Ninaithu  and the actor shot for the film for a few days before opting out of the project, owing to creative differences. He was subsequently replaced by Suriya. Vikraman also briefly considered casting actor Prashanth, before finalising Suriya.

The team predominantly shot the film in Chennai and Visakhapatnam areas, while songs were shot in Malaysia, Thailand and Sri Lanka. The team travelled to Kandy and the Ramboda Falls to film sequences across Sri Lanka, and it became the first film by director Vikraman to be shot outside India. Dubbing artist Jayageetha dubbed for Sneha, while Dubbing artist Savitha Reddy dubbed for Laila.

Soundtrack

The music for the film was composed by Sirpy, this film also earned him the Best Music Director Award from the Government of Tamil Nadu for the year 2002.

Release and reception
The film opened in May 2002 to mixed reviews from critics. A reviewer from The Hindu wrote, "the story must have had a strong theme to begin with and the screenplay surely aims at conveying something different. But things do not progress in that direction", and adds that "the treatment lacks punch". The reviewers from Sify.com gave the film a negative review, adding "the film is very slow and one feels that the story is as old as the hills", adding that it is a "rehash of the director's earlier hits and is long winded and extremely slow paced mainly due to illogical story, songs pushed into the narrative and a jarring comedy track".

The film went on to perform well at the box office, and did exceptional business in town and village theatres across Tamil Nadu. Owing to the film's success, it was later remade in Telugu as Cheppave Chirugali (2004) by Vikraman, while it was also made in Kannada as Krishna (2007).

Awards

References

External links
 

2002 films
Tamil films remade in other languages
2000s Tamil-language films
Indian drama films
Films directed by Vikraman
Films shot in Chennai
Films shot in Malaysia
Films shot in Thailand
Films shot in Sri Lanka
2002 drama films